Pečka may refer to:

 Pecica, Hungarian: Pécska; German: Petschka; Serbian: Печка/Pečka); Romania
 Pečka (Bosnia and Herzegovina), Republika Srpska, Bosnia